Donabate is a small coastal town in Fingal, Ireland, about  north-northeast of Dublin. The town is on a peninsula on Ireland's east coast, between the Rogerstown Estuary to the north and Broadmeadow Estuary to the south. Donabate is a civil parish in the ancient barony of Nethercross.

Geography
The Donabate peninsula forms a distinctive hammer-head shape. This is because each of the mouths of both estuaries surrounding the peninsula are partially closed by large sand spits stretching north to south. The northern spit contains Portrane beach which almost touches Rush South Beach but for a narrow channel entering the Rogerstown Estuary. A stretch of low limestone cliffs to the south of Portrane beach leads to Donabate Beach which is the east face of the southern spit. The southern Broadmeadow estuary is likewise almost completely enclosed and is fed by the Broadmeadow river. The shelter provided by the spits had made the estuaries important wildlife habitats and both are protected under the international Ramsar Convention.

History
The census of 1912 recorded that the town had a population of 734 people who lived in 150 dwellings. It remained a small village for more than a century. In recent years, the area's access to the capital city of Dublin has improved with upgraded roads and the re-opening of a former railway station. The census of 1996 recorded that the population was 1868; by the time of the 2002 census it had doubled to 3,854. The most recent 2016 census results record a population of 7,443.

Representation

Administratively, Donabate is in Fingal, in the historic County Dublin. The Donabate-Portrane peninsula is in the Swords ward (or local electoral area, to give it its official title). The Swords ward is numerically the largest in Fingal county and elects nine county councillors to Fingal County Council. In terms of national elections, the Donabate Portrane peninsula is in the Dublin Fingal constituency, which sends five TDs to Dáil Éireann.

Donabate Portrane Community Council is the community council for the Donabate Portrane Peninsula.

Donabate Portrane Community and Leisure Centre is the area's newest public building, that opened in 2001. The town has an active Chamber of Commerce, Scout Group (63rd Dublin 14th Port Donabate), and two soccer clubs (St Ita's AFC and Portrane Athletic), a G.A.A club (St Patrick's), Karate and Tae-Kwon Do clubs, a snooker club, a Historical and Folklore Society, and a Tidy Towns Committee, among other groups.

Education
National schools (primary schools) serving the area include Donabate Portrane Educate-Together National School, St Patrick's Girls National School, and St Patrick's Boys National School. Donabate Community College VEC is a local post-primary school (secondary school). Donabate opened its first Gaelscoil primary school, Gaelscoil na Mara, in 2020.

Religion
Donabate was a distinct parish in the Fingal North deanery of the Roman Catholic Archdiocese of Dublin. It is currently part of the grouped parishes of Donabate, Portrane and Balheary. It is served by the church of St Patrick.

Other churches in the area include: Church of Ireland (St Patrick's Church) and Donabate Presbyterian Church, which meets at Donabate Portrane Community Centre.

Sport

Golf
There are five courses on the peninsula: The Island Golf Club, Beaverstown Golf Club, Balcarrick Golf Club, Donabate Golf Club (a 27-hole course) and Corballis Links Golf Club (a public course). The peninsula was once home to a sixth club, Turvey Golf Club, situated on the former Turvey estate, that has since closed. Many of these have views of the estuaries or the open sea, including links courses such as The Island, which is ranked as one of the top 20 courses in Ireland.

GAA
St Patrick's GAA (Cumann Lúthchleas Gael, Naomh Pádraig) club in Donabate dates from 1924. It is an active club with a membership of over 300 . The club play at Robbie Farrell Park,
Ballymastone in Donabate. Gaelic Football and Hurling are played at adult level as well as at under-age levels from an expanding nursery section. The club colours are green and black.

Football
St. Ita's Athletic Football Club (AFC) has been active in Donabate Portrane from the early 20th century. They currently play in the Leinster league and field many underage players.

The main pitch is the grounds of the St. Ita's Hospital and they also play on pitches in Portrane and Balcarrick Road. Club colours are green and white.

Water sports

Although Ireland's east coast is not ideal for surfing, surfers are regularly seen at Donabate beach. Kayaking, sailing and wind surfing are popular water sports especially in the Broadmeadow estuary with access from Donabate and Malahide. There are marinas in Rush and Malahide.  Kite surfing is rising in popularity on the beaches of Portrane, Rush and Skerries. The use of jet skis and fast powerboats is restricted by law in the estuaries and beaches and regulated by permit.

Both Donabate and Portrane beaches are staffed by lifeguards during the summer months. In 2009 Portrane beach was among several Irish beaches to lose its blue flag status for beach excellence due to poor water quality, but subsequently regained blue flag status and from 2011 to 2015 had a status of Good or Excellent.

Hockey
Portrane Hockey Club was founded in 1919 and plays in the Leinster senior league. The club suffered from the introduction of compulsory synthetic pitches in the 1990s as they were unable to continue using their grass pitch in St. Ita's Hospital. However, the club had remained active and hoped to move to an all-weather pitch on the site of the Secondary School scheduled for September 2010. But a flood caused the pitch to be unsafe for play. In 2015 the pitch was up and running again.

Equestrian
The hunter trials of the Ward Union Hunt are held at Corballis Farm in Corballis Donabate.

Bouldering
The cliffs between Donabate and Portrane have recently become known as a site for bouldering

Culture

Newbridge Estate

Donabate has a fine historical "Big House and Estate" at Newbridge Estate. Newbridge House is a Georgian mansion built for Charles Cobbe, Archbishop of Dublin in 1736. The grounds also include a late medieval castellated tower house named Lanestown Castle. The estate was bought by Fingal County Council in a unique arrangement with the Cobbe family in 1985 and is now a public park, playground and model farm, while the family continue to maintain an apartment within the main building on a part-time basis. The park is a popular recreational area all year round, and also contains playing pitches used by local sports clubs.

Newbridge House was a location for the 1965 film The Spy Who Came in from the Cold (film). In 2009 a previously unrecognised rare portrait of William Shakespeare was found to have been hanging in the drawing-room of the house.

The Farm at Newbridge can be found to the west and north of Newbridge House and beside the Walled Garden. Between 1989 and 1990 the County Council Parks Department undertook the renovation, reconstruction and restoration of the Courtyard, Haggard and adjoining buildings restoring it to its 19th-century Victorian character. A wide range of farm animals and fowl are now housed here, including many rare or show breeds, and it is a popular visitor attraction.

Transition Town Donabate Portrane 

Donabate has a vibrant Transition Town movement. There are currently a number of projects running in the Donabate area including a local weekly food market, and also to transform the disused St. Ita's Gardens & Farm into a working community farm and orchard.

Wildlife

In 2008 Fingal County Council published an ambitious plan to develop a large wildlife park and natural amenity that would span both sides of the Rogerstown Estuary. Fingal Parks Department gave a summary of some of the features of the plan as:

The proposed development will include new entrances, a car park with 120 car parking spaces, 250 allotments,
 of walkways, a new bridge adjacent to the railway bridge, woodland and hedgerow planting, hay meadows,
reintroduction of cattle to graze the grasslands and interpretative facilities.

Rogerstown Estuary
Rogerstown Estuary is an important wetland habitat. It has several designations in recognition of this including that of Statutory Nature Reserve. BirdWatch Ireland owns land on both north and south shores of the inner estuary and played a large role in preserving the area in its natural state in spite of its proximity to large urban areas by purchasing tracts of land and entering into management agreements with the Council and landowners. The Fingal Branch of BirdWatch Ireland operates two hides in Rogerstown which are wardened at weekends during certain times of the year.

Broadmeadow Estuary
Broadmeadow Estuary, like the Rogerstown Estuary, is designated a  Special Area of Conservation (SAC) and Special Protection Area (SPA). The estuary has an internationally important population of Brent Goose and nationally important populations of other species of birds.

Transport

Rail

Donabate railway station, in the centre of the town, is on the Dublin–Belfast mainline and is served by Northern Commuter line trains between Dublin and Dundalk. The Transport 21 infrastructure plan envisaged electrification north of Malahide and through Donabate as far as Balbriggan by 2015, though this was subsequently indefinitely deferred.

Viaduct collapse

On 21 August 2009 the 18:07 train from Balbriggan to Connolly was passing over the viaduct when the driver noticed subsidence and the embankment giving way on the northbound track. The train passed over the bridge before it collapsed and the driver alerted authorities. This was later determined to be caused by scour A major catastrophe was avoided but commuters faced significant subsequent disruption. A bus service was added between Donabate and Malahide train stations to facilitate passenger transport.

Road
The R126 regional road, connecting Portrane to the R127 and the M1 motorway, runs through the town. Go-Ahead Ireland service 33B from Swords to Portrane and Dublin Bus service 33D from Custom House Quay to Portrane serve Donabate. During the morning peak times some service 33 routes serve Donabate.

Owing to the proximity of the area to Dublin city, Dublin Airport and major national road networks, the area houses Tesco Donabate Distribution Centre which is the eleventh largest building in the world by usable volume.

Notable people
Stephen Rea
Frances Power Cobbe
Paddy Neville (1920-1977), sportsman
Conor Grant, Irish footballer for Milton Keynes Dons F.C.

See also
 List of towns and villages in Ireland

References

Towns and villages in Fingal
Spits of Europe
Civil parishes of the barony of Nethercross
Townlands of Fingal
Nethercross